Eugene J. Poole (November 5, 1880 – April 10, 1958) was an American farmer and politician.

Born in the Town of Cedarburg, Ozaukee County, Wisconsin, Poole was a farmer. He was also in the funeral home and tavern businesses. Poole served in the Wisconsin State Assembly in 1915 and 1917 and was a Democrat. Poole died at a hospital in West Bend, Wisconsin.

Notes

1880 births
1958 deaths
People from Cedarburg, Wisconsin
Businesspeople from Wisconsin
Farmers from Wisconsin
Democratic Party members of the Wisconsin State Assembly
20th-century American politicians
20th-century American businesspeople